Patrick Meehan (1927–1994) was the victim of a controversial miscarriage of justice in Scotland.

Patrick Meehan may also refer to:

Patrick Meehan (Irish politician, born 1852) (1852–1913), Irish Nationalist MP
Patrick Meehan (Irish politician, born 1877) (1877–1929), his son, also an Irish Nationalist MP
Patrick Meehan (producer), record producer
Pat Meehan (born 1955), US attorney and member of the House of Representatives
Paddy Meehan (footballer), Republic of Ireland international footballer
Paddy Meehan, a fictional reporter created by Denise Mina
Charles Patrick Meehan (1812–1890), Catholic priest and historian